William III of Mâcon (1088–1156), also known as William IV of Burgundy, was Count of Mâcon (1102–1156), count of Auxonne (1127–1156), count of Vienne (1148–1156) and regent of the county of Burgundy (1148–1156).  He was a younger son of Stephen I, Count of Burgundy, and of Beatrice of Lorraine. After the death of his brother, Renaud III, he took control of the county of Burgundy in the name of his niece Beatrice. He effectively imprisoned Beatrice and was recognized as count by the emperor Frederick Barbarossa by 1152. He died in 1156 while on Crusade in the Holy Land, and Frederick married Beatrice and took over the county.

William married Adelaide-Pontia (Poncette), heiress of Lord Theobald of Traves, and had the following issue:
Stephen II, who succeeded to Auxonne, Trier and the title Count of Burgundy. His son was:
 Stephen III of Auxonne
Girard I, who succeeded to Mâcon, Vien. Among his children were:
 Beatrice of Viennois (died 8.4.1230) married c. 1175 to Umberto III, Count of Savoy (born 1136 - died 1189).
Malaspina, possibly illegitimate.

Notes

1088 births
1156 deaths
Counts of Mâcon
Counts of Vienne
Counts of Burgundy
Anscarids